The National emblem of Afghanistan is a national symbol of Afghanistan that has appeared in some form on the flag of Afghanistan since 1901.

Historical emblems

Year numbers

Different years are shown in some emblems, as shown below. (Another year can be seen in the emblem of 1974–1978.)

See also 

Flag of Afghanistan

Notes

References

External links 
Afghanistan Ministry of Foreign Affairs 
 /Afghanistan-national-symbol.htm Afghanistan/Khurasan National Emblem

National symbols of Afghanistan
Kingdom of Afghanistan
Afghanistan
Afghanistan
Afghanistan
Afghanistan
Afghanistan